Diane is an album by trumpeter Chet Baker and pianist Paul Bley recorded in Denmark in 1985 and released on the SteepleChase label.

Critical reception
The authors of The Penguin Guide to Jazz Recordings describe Bley as an ideal duo partner for Baker, and say that only a “murky sound” prevented the album receiving a four star rating.

Track listing
 "If I Should Lose You" (Ralph Rainger, Leo Robin) - 7:16  
 "You Go to My Head" (J. Fred Coots, Haven Gillespie) - 7:03  
 "How Deep Is the Ocean?" (Irving Berlin) - 5:17  
 "Pent-Up House" (Sonny Rollins) - 3:55  
 "Ev'ry Time We Say Goodbye" (Cole Porter) - 7:52  
 "Diane" (Lew Pollack, Ernö Rapée) - 5:31  
 "Skidadidlin'" (Chet Baker) - 4:16
 "Little Girl Blue" (Lorenz Hart, Richard Rodgers) - 5:27 (LP), 10:23 (CD)

Personnel 
Chet Baker - trumpet, vocals (track 2)
Paul Bley - piano

References 

1985 albums
Chet Baker albums
Paul Bley albums
SteepleChase Records albums